The Jingbao Expressway is an expressway.

It is the first full expressway to link central Beijing, alongside the Badaling Expressway, directly to the city of Baotou in Inner Mongolia. It passes through the major urban areas of Zhangjiakou, Datong, and Hohhot.

It eases traffic on China National Highway 110, which was previously the only trunk road headed for Baotou from the national capital.

Expressways in China